La Casamaures is a historic 19th century villa, in the commune of Saint-Martin-le-Vinoux near Grenoble, in the Department of Isère, within the Auvergne-Rhône-Alpes region of France. A listed French Monument historique, it is undergoing restoration.

Villa
In 1855, Joseph Julien Cochard, resident of Grenoble, bought land along the Isère in the foothills of the Massif de la Chartreuse to build a residence.

It was designed in the Moorish Revival—Arab-Andalusian style, with elaborate facades, architectural elements, and fine detailing.

The villa was built of formed and molded concrete, and completed in 1867.

References

External links 
 Official site

Buildings and structures in Grenoble
Moorish Revival architecture
Monuments historiques of Isère
Tourist attractions in Grenoble